The least long-fingered bat (Miniopterus minor) is a species of vesper bat in the family Miniopteridae. It can be found in the Republic of the Congo, the Democratic Republic of the Congo, Kenya, São Tomé and Príncipe, and Tanzania.

References

Miniopteridae
Taxa named by Wilhelm Peters
Mammals described in 1866
Bats of Africa
Taxonomy articles created by Polbot